Glyphipterix danilevskii is a moth of the  family Glyphipterigidae. It is found in Romania.

References

Moths described in 1978
Glyphipterigidae
Moths of Europe